Mainstream Media is a digital News media organization founded in 1996, that operates multiple news portals specific to the regions, countries and major cities in the world.

Operation
The group was founded as a news distribution portal in 1996 in Manama, Bahrain. Mainstream Media claims it has progressively developed its network using the latest cutting edge technology, software innovations and interactive social media.

Mainstream Media may have pioneered the development of news sites on a global basis. It began registering generic news domain names with the news.net extension in 1999, picking up names for every available location. According to Website Informer the company's ten most popular sites are The Las Vegas News.Net, Britain News.Net, The Japan News.Net, Asia Pacific News.Net, Pakistan News.Net, Brazil News.Net, Israel News.Net, Nepal News.Net, Australian News.Net and Indonesia News.Net.

The group's network includes the oldest Philippines news site on the Web, Philippines News.Net. Reflecting the global nature of the readership of Mainstream's sites, Philippines News.Net is also one of two sites recommended by the Canadian Foreign Affairs Ministry on its website offering information for Canadians visiting the Philippines.

Part of the news content displayed on the group's sites is drawn from Big news Network, while content is also obtained on a contract basis from other news agencies, and its own in-house journalists. The group has a stated objective of expanding its own unique content.

History
Mainstream Media EC was incorporated in Bahrain on 17 November 1996. In November 2013 the company name changed to Mainstream Media Limited following a company restructure and the incorporation of the new entity in the United Kingdom.

Development
With the ownership of Mainstream Media being Australian, the initial site launched was Australian News.Net. New Zealand News.Net followed. By the end of 1999 the group had established sites for all countries in Asia including China News.Net, Singapore News.Net, Hong Kong News.Net, Thailand News.Net, Indonesia News.Net, and Pakistan News.Net. The inventory also included city sites such as Beijing News.Net, Shanghai News.Net, Seoul News.Net, Bangkok News.Net, Mumbai News.Net and Taipei News.Net. With events heating up in the Middle East, Israel News.Net, Palestinian News.Net and Middle East News.Net followed, then the network extended to the United States with US News.Net, New York City News.Net, Miami News.Net, Chicago News.Net, Los Angeles News.Net, and Houston News.Net among others coming on stream. In all, more than 60 of the group's sites are U.S. sites. Europe News.Net was then established together with a string of sites related to European countries and cities. Surprisingly Mainstream appears to own news.net domain names for almost all regions, countries and cities around the world.

11 September 2001
The group's Afghanistan news website attracted hundreds of thousands of unique visitors in the immediate aftermath of the 9/11 terrorist attacks in the United States, largely because of the understanding Osama bin Laden had launched the attacks from his base in Afghanistan. Afghanistan News.Net received thousands of angry and abusive emails and posts on its chat board, while hackers eventually took the site down, which resulted in the entire Mainstream Media network going down. The United States Library of Congress included Afghanistan News.Net in its 11 September Web Archive of sites portraying expressions of individuals, groups, media and institutions in the wake of the 11 September attacks.

Afghanistan News.Net is also a selected Internet resource on Afghanistan for Berkeley Library.

Servers domain name hijacking
In August 2006 Mainstream Media's two hundred news portals went offline for several days when the domain name on which its Toronto-based servers were hosted was stolen and sold on eBay for $20,000. Mainstream sued several parties in California where the domain, www.fm.net, was registered. Shortly before the case was concluded the 'buyer' transferred the domain name to Afriregister S.A., a little-known domain name registry in Burundi, in Africa, which took the case out of the United States District Court for the Northern District of California jurisdiction.

New South Wales, Australia Police investigated the theft of the domain name and arrested a former Mainstream employee working in the company's Sydney office who had hacked into Mainstream's computer system and transferred the domain to a fictitious person in July 2006. A month later the man sold the domain on eBay for $20,000. He was convicted and sentenced to community service and ordered to pay restitution of $25,800. The money was never paid. Today Mainstream uses its corporate site to host its servers.

Interaction with social media
Mainstream Media's sites are linked to major Social Media Networks reflecting the immense on-going change in news publishing, packaging and distribution taking place today, where news is not only being consumed – but is being shared, and added to – and where the biggest growth in traffic for news sites is coming from social media referrals.

Affiliations
Mainstream Media was a forerunner to a broader enlarged group which brought in Big News Network around 2000 and led to the establishment of a network of online newspapers in collaboration with Midwest Radio Network beginning in 2002. At one point in 1999 Mainstream Media through a holding company owned just under 5% of ASX-listed public company Midwest Radio Limited, in which Midwest Radio Network also had a shareholding (39%).

References

1996 establishments in Bahrain
Mass media companies of Bahrain
Mass media companies established in 1996
Mass media in Manama
British news websites
Publishing companies established in 1996
Internet properties established in 1999
Bahraini news websites